Dragon Ball: Curse of the Blood Rubies, known in Japan as Dragon Ball during its initial theatrical release and later retitled  for its home video release, is a 1986 Japanese animated martial arts fantasy adventure film and the first alternate continuity in a series of feature films in the Dragon Ball anime franchise, based on the manga of the same name by Akira Toriyama. The film is a modified adaptation of the initial story arc of the manga, with the original character King Gurumes substituting Emperor Pilaf's role as the main antagonist. It depicts how Goku meets up with Bulma, as well as Oolong, Yamcha, Puar and finally Master Roshi during his first search for the Dragon Balls. Gurumes and the other new characters were designed for the film by Toriyama.

Curse of the Blood Rubies was originally released in Japan on December 20, 1986 at the  film festival, where it was shown as part of a triple feature along with Gegege no Kitarō Gekitotsu!! Ijigen Yōkai no Dai Hanran and Kinnikuman – Seigi Choujin vs. Senshi Choujin.

Plot 

His two main enforcers are Pasta and Bongo, whom he has also tasked with finding the Dragon Balls. Since finding the Blood Rubies, Gurumes has fallen under a curse that turns him into a large, purple monster and makes his hunger insatiable. He hopes to wish the curse away with the Dragon Balls. A rebellious little girl named Pansy, after her father gets a brutal beating by Bongo in defending her, decides to go and find help.

Goku, a young monkey-tailed boy with special strength, is living alone in the wilderness of Mount Paozu. While he is catching a giant fish, a blue-haired teenage girl named Bulma, who is also searching for the Dragon Balls with the help of a device called a Dragon Radar, runs into Goku. Thinking Bulma is a monster, Goku prepares to attack her, but Bulma convinces him that she is a human. After learning that Bulma is a girl, Goku tells her that his grandpa gave him a Dragon Ball before he died. Pasta and Bongo arrive at Goku's home and steal his Dragon Ball, leaving a gold coin in its place. They flee in their fighter jet, but are defeated by Goku with his Power Pole.

Later that night, Goku and Bulma find Pansy being accosted by a large monster named Oolong, who has the ability to shape-shift into any other forms. Oolong flees when Goku proves his strength by destroying a large tree, but he chases the shape-shifter and, knocking him down with his Power Pole, finds out that his true form is that of a pig. While snapping at the curious Goku, Oolong freaks out when he realizes they have landed in the territory of Yamcha the Desert Bandit. Then suddenly, Yamcha and his sidekick Puar, Oolong's former classmate from the shape-shifting school where he was expelled for stealing the teacher's panties, attacks the duo. Goku battles Yamcha through weapon fighting which later moves onto their special moves such as Yamcha's Wolf Fang Fist and Goku's Rock-Scissors-Paper, but their duel is cut short when Bulma arrives. Yamcha has a paralyzing fear of beautiful women upon seeing Bulma and, chipping off his tooth after crashing down from the cliff where he and Goku are standing on to fight, he and Puar retreat. In Oolong's campout, Pansy tells Bulma and the others about her people's plight and how she must find the great Master Roshi the Turtle Hermit to help her put a stop to King Gurumes' cruelty. But little do the group know is that Yamcha and Puar have returned, overhearing everything about the Dragon Balls. The next day, Yamcha and Puar prepares for their trip to Master Roshi's island in order to get rid of Goku and his friends while going after the Dragon Balls for themselves. As part of their scheme, Yamcha vows that he will wish away his shyness around girls so he could either get married or have a few dates, despite Puar's protest over the unnecessary choice of needing all the treasures or ruling the world. Back at his palace, King Gurumes now possesses five of the Dragon Balls and ensures that the last two will go next.

The team arrives on Master Roshi's island, but Yamcha has arrived first and tricked Roshi into thinking Goku is there to steal his shell. To find out who's telling the truth, Roshi summons the Flying Nimbus Cloud, a magic cloud which only an honest person can ride. After Roshi's failed attempt as a demonstration, Goku successfully rides it; Yamcha flees again, vowing that he will be back. Master Roshi also says he will give Bulma his Dragon Ball, but only if she shows him her boobs. In order to avoid Roshi, Bulma uses Oolong to transform into her in order to trick the Turtle Hermit, and it works. But Pasta and Bongo arrive in a submarine and attack the island. One of Bulma's two Dragon Balls is stolen, and Roshi's house is destroyed. Angered by the destruction of his house, Roshi powers up and uses the Kamehameha to destroy the submarine, while Pasta and Bongo flee in an escape jet. Pansy asks Roshi to help her defeat King Gurumes, but he declines and assures Pansy that Goku and Bulma will be all the help she needs. That night at King Gurumes' palace, Pasta states her report about the arrival of the final Dragon Ball, much to her master's delight.

The next day, the team journey to King Gurumes' palace and are immediately attacked by the king's air force. Bulma, Oolong, and Pansy are shot down while Goku has an aerial duel with Bongo, in which the monkey-tailed fighter destroys Bongo's hovercraft. Yamcha and Puar also arrive and infiltrate the palace, where they meet up with the group. Yamcha is attacked by Pasta, but is unable to fight back because of his phobia of beautiful women, so they flee with Pasta in hot pursuit. Goku defeats Bongo by knocking him through a wall with his Power Pole, and they all end up in King Gurumes' throne room. Fueled by both his own curse and hunger, Gurumes grows to his gigantic size before the very eyes of the group, and after crushing Bongo flat, he attacks Goku to get the last Dragon Ball. Goku tries the Kamehameha [which he already learned from Master Roshi] but it fails to destroy him. Bulma realizes the other six Dragon Balls are inside Gurumes' stomach, so she throws her Dragon Ball into his mouth. Shenron erupts from Gurumes' body and offers to grant one wish. Pansy wishes for her land to be peaceful and beautiful again. Shenron then removes all the Blood Rubies and makes the land fertile again. Gurumes is reduced to a small, bald, naked man; Yamcha and Bulma decide to date; and Goku, after returning the gold coin to Pasta, heads off to Master Roshi's island to train with the Turtle Hermit.

Cast

Music 
OP (Opening Theme):
"Makafushigi Adventure!"
Lyrics by 
Music by 
Arranged by Kōhei Tanaka
Performed by 
ED (Ending Theme):

Lyrics by 
Music by 
Arranged by Kōhei Tanaka
Performed by

English dub soundtracks 
The BLT English dubs replace the Japanese score with music composed by Peter Berring, with a theme song by Peter Berring and Brian Griffith, and performed by Canadian singer Dave Steele. This theme song was heard on the BLT dub of the first thirteen episodes of the original Dragon Ball.

The Funimation English dub featured an English version of the Japanese theme songs performed by Jimi Tunnell and Daphne Gere respectively, which were recorded for their in-house English adaptation of the television series.

Releases

Box office 
At the Japanese box office, the film sold  tickets and earned a net distribution rental income of ,.

English-language versions 
Curse of the Blood Rubies (originally titled Dragon Ball: The Movie, and later Dragon Ball: The Legend of Shenron) was originally licensed to Harmony Gold USA who dubbed and released the film in conjunction with Mystical Adventure, simply titled Dragonball. The dub aired on December 28, 1989, as a special to the TV series on WPSG Philly 57 in Philadelphia, Pennsylvania. It was edited for content, and most of the characters were renamed. The audio track was recorded at InterSound, inc. in Hollywood, CA, United States. Because of the failure with Harmony Gold's release of the franchise, the Dragon Ball series was dropped, and the two films were eventually picked up by Funimation Productions in the mid-1990s.

The second English version of Curse of the Blood Rubies, which was produced by Funimation as a pilot to sell the Dragon Ball series to American syndicators, was originally premiered on syndication on September 9, 1995 (along with the first episode of the Emperor Pilaf Saga; "Secret of the Dragon Balls"), and released on VHS in North America by Trimark on September 24, 1996. However, unlike the previous dub, most of the series' returning characters got to keep their original names (though this dub did make use of most of the supporting character names from the 1989 dub, such as Penny). There was also an obscure version of the dub (here subtitled Curse of the Blood Rubie ), which used the names from the Harmony Gold version, and which seems to have been produced in 1994. In addition, the dialogue was loosely based on the 1989 dub script. The audio track for this English dub was recorded in Vancouver, BC, Canada. The film was also edited for content and used a scene from the second episode of the TV series to fill in lost time (the scene was not included in the 1994 demo version). The dub was later released on Region 1 DVD on October 24, 2000 as part of the Saga of Goku set from Trimark along with Funimation/BLT Productions' original dub of the first thirteen episodes of the TV series. The 1995 English dub was also released on DVD in Australia by Madman Entertainment as part of the Saga of Goku set released to Region 4 DVD, despite using Funimation's newer in-house dub of the first thirteen episodes. This version was also released on VCD in Malaysia by Speedy Video, as Dragon Ball: The Movie. Unlike most of the other films in the franchise, Speedy Video had never dubbed this film, instead using the 1995 version.

Another English dub of the film was produced for European markets by AB Groupe and dubbed in France and aired in the UK as The Legend of Shenron on Toonami UK in the summer of 2005, and was released on DVD as the alternate English language track on some European releases. It is likely that the cast used for this version consists of English-speaking voice actors in Paris, France.

On April 6, 2010, Funimation announced that Curse of the Blood Rubies would be released to a bilingual DVD on July 27, 2010, but the release was delayed to December 28, 2010. Funimation announced the voice cast for a new English dub of the film on November 12, 2010. The 2010 English dub is mostly unedited (the only visual edits being to the title and credit sequences), but the script was mostly recycled from the 1995 English dub (which itself was based on the 1989 dub script), with the most notable change being all the character names reverting to their originals. The audio was recorded in Dallas, Texas. However, very few voice actors from Funimation's English dub of the original Dragon Ball series reprised their roles for this film, with their replacements from the dub of Dragon Ball Z Kai (in production at the time) being used instead.

The film might possibly have been dubbed before all the aforementioned versions by Frontier Enterprises, a Tokyo-based company that specialized in dubbing Japanese films and TV series, including the Godzilla series and Lupin III: The Mystery of Mamo. This was indicated by an interview with DJ/voice actor Richard Nieskens, who said that he worked on dubbing Dragon Ball Z in December of 1986  as his first voice acting job, though it is likely he was referring to this film, given Frontier's activity at the time. This brings the total number of English versions to six, if the 1994 test dub by Funimation and BLT Productions is counted, the most dubs an animated film has ever received.

The film (containing the 2010 dub) was later re-released in a Dragon Ball Movie 4-Pack on February 8, 2011.

Notes

References

External links 

 
 
 Dragon Ball at the MPAJ 

1986 films
1986 anime films
Curse of the Blood Rubies
Films directed by Daisuke Nishio
Films about wish fulfillment
Funimation
Japanese animated fantasy films
Japanese fantasy action films
Japanese fantasy adventure films
1980s Japanese-language films
Toei Animation films
Films scored by Shunsuke Kikuchi
1986 directorial debut films